Palaina deliciosa, also known as the minuscule staircase snail, is a species of staircase snail that is endemic to Australia's Lord Howe Island in the Tasman Sea.

Description
The pupiform shell of adult snails is 1.5 mm in height, with a diameter of 0.9 mm, with deeply impressed sutures. It is white in colour, with golden apical whorls. It has moderately spaced axal ribs. The umbilicus is closed. The circular aperture has an operculum.

Habitat
The snail is common and widespread across the island.

References

 
deliciosa
Gastropods of Lord Howe Island
Taxa named by Tom Iredale
Gastropods described in 1944